Asclepia Gandolfo (22 July 1864 in Imperia – 31 August 1925 in Rome) was an Italian military officer, who served as a general in the Royal Italian Army.

Biography
Gandolfo was commissioned into the Royal Italian Army as a second lieutenant in 1885, after graduating from the Military Academy of Modena. At the outbreak of World War I, as lieutenant colonel he was placed in command of the 10th Infantry Regiment. In 1916 he obtained the Medal of Military Valor and promotion to major general with the command of the Pisa Brigade. In 1917 he commanded the 31st Division. In June 1918 he was promoted to lieutenant general and commander of the VIII Army Corps.

In Fiume (now Rijeka, Croatia) in September 1919 he refused to have Gabriele D'Annunzio's legionaries shot by his troops during the Impresa di Fiume. For this reason, in 1920 the government of Prime Minister Francesco Saverio Nitti transferred him to the reserve. In 1921 he joined the National Fascist Party (PNF).

Member of the Grand Council of Fascism, in January 1923 he was appointed prefect of Cagliari by Benito Mussolini, and in May 1924 he returned to the ranks of the army, and promoted to army corps general.

He served as commander of the MVSN from 1 December 1924 until his death on 31 August 1925.

Freemasonry
He was a Freemason, and was part of the "Giuseppe Mazzini" lodge of Sanremo, "but resigned because it was so republican that the presence of military personnel was impossible".

Personal life
Gandolfo was married to Maria Martini in 1894, he was widowed the following year, and in 1905 he remarried with Teresa Manfredi.

Decorations

See also
List of senior officers of the Blackshirts

References

External links

1864 births
1925 deaths
People from the Province of Imperia
Italian generals
Italian military personnel of World War I
Italian Freemasons
National Fascist Party politicians
Members of the Grand Council of Fascism
Recipients of the Order of Saints Maurice and Lazarus
Recipients of the Silver Medal of Military Valor